Meier Helmbrecht is a 1928 play by the German writer Eugen Ortner. A historical tragedy set around 1250, it was first staged at the Munich Kammerspiele. It was subsequently staged less successfully at the Staatliches Schauspielhaus in Berlin with a cast including Veit Harlan and Friedrich Kayßler.

This 1928 play draws from the ca. 1250-1280 satirical poem of the same name by the bavarian-austrian author .

References

Bibliography
 Noack, Frank. Veit Harlan: The Life and Work of a Nazi Filmmaker. University Press of Kentucky, 2016.

1928 plays
German plays
Plays set in Germany
Plays set in the 13th century